Zef Gashi (Cyrillic: Зеф Гаши / Zef Gaši; born 4 December 1938) is an ethnic Albanian prelate of the Roman Catholic Church in Montenegro. He was the Archbishop of the Roman Catholic Archdiocese of Bar between 1998 and 2016.

Zef Gashi was born on in Pristina, Kingdom of Yugoslavia (modern Kosovo). In 1964, he was ordained priest of the order of the Salesians of Don Bosco. In 1998, he became the archbishop of the Roman Catholic Archdiocese of Bar. He was retired in 2016.

Notes and references
Notes:

References:

Living people
20th-century Roman Catholic archbishops in Montenegro
21st-century Roman Catholic archbishops in Montenegro
1938 births
Salesians of Don Bosco
Albanian Roman Catholic archbishops
People from Pristina
Archbishops of Antivari
Serbian Roman Catholic archbishops